Hipcamp is an online marketplace company that offers outdoor stays and camping experiences via a website and mobile app. Private landowners primarily list campsites, glampsites, RV spaces, cabins for users to discover and book based on listing type, location, landscape, activities offered, and amenities. In addition to offering overnight stays on private land, Hipcamp also displays real-time availability, details, user reviews, and user photos of public campgrounds in national parks. Hipcamp was founded in San Francisco, California, United States, in 2013, by CEO Alyssa Ravasio.

History

CEO and founder Ravasio grew up camping and adventuring in Northern California, where she was born. In 2012, Ravasio was concerned when it was announced that a number of California state parks were in danger of closing due to lack of funding. She believed that if discovering and booking campsites were easier, the California State Park system would benefit from an increase in traffic and funding. This idea came to a head when Ravasio was attempting to find a nearby campsite on the beach for New Year's Eve in 2013. In her search, she found the online research process tedious and scattered.  She eventually found a campground on the coast, but had neglected to bring her surfboard because none of the online data mentioned this particular beach was a popular surfing spot.

Ravasio then enrolled in Dev Bootcamp, a 12-week coding crash course in order to launch her web company idea. In spring 2013, she took a Lean Product Development course through Femgineer and was awarded their GitHub scholarship in June 2013 to fund Hipcamp's launch. After learning to code, Ravasio created the beta version of Hipcamp that went live in June 2013.

Eric Bach, an avid and high-profile backpacker and world traveler, joined Ravasio in July 2013, and was later promoted to co-founder. The two bonded over the outdoors and a desire to solve the "camping problem."

Hipcamp's development continued when, in December 2013, Ravasio won a cash reward for her project in the Ideation Nation's "civic hacking" competition, sponsored by Code for America and MindMixer, in search of the best idea to improve government use of technology. MindMixer felt Ravasio's idea was a clear solution to the proposed problem and that it could easily be expanded across the nation.

In September 2014, Hipcamp raised $2 million in seed funding led by O'Reilly Media's AlphaTech Ventures and Slow Ventures, with participation from Dave Morin, Sam Shank, Gregg Brockway, AngelList's Syndicate Fund and Maiden Lane Ventures.

Product

Hipcamp allows users to search for and book outdoor stays and campgrounds based on location, natural features (beach, waterfall, forest, etc.), activities (biking, hiking, rock climbing, etc.), and amenities (showers, pets allowed, RV hookups, etc.) to personalize the camping research process. It also enables users to search available sites based on requested dates. Users can "favorite" parks and save them to their Hipcamp account or share them on social media. Hipcamp also encourages users to upload photos and reviews for parks, campgrounds, and campsites they have visited.

Hipcamp runs a blog, or Journal, which features gear reviews, camping trips, tips and tricks, and photographer spotlights. They also write reviews and contribute material for other news publications. The website has a presence on Facebook, Twitter, Instagram, and Pinterest.

Popularity 
According to Alexa, Hipcamp is ranked at 42,122 in the U.S. Hipcamp started with campground coverage in the San Francisco Bay Area, and has expanded to cover all of California, Texas, Florida, and Oregon as of March 2015. It has national lodging coverage as of 2018.

Recent platform changes and the COVID-19 pandemic led to Hipcamp seeing substantial growth in 2020; that summer, they generated three times the leads that they did in 2019.

Related work 
Hipcamp works closely with the Access Land coalition. Access Land works to increase access to public lands by advocating for open data and APIs for all public lands.

In 2015, Hipcamp partnered with Stamen Design and GreenInfo to develop caliparks.org. CaliParks is a statewide, parks search engine that brings together park boundary and management data with social media content from Instagram, Flickr, Twitter, and Foursquare. Hipcamp provided activity data on the largest parks in California. The project was made possible by the Resource Legacy Fund via the State's Parks Forward Commission.

References

External links
 Hipcamp

Companies based in San Francisco